Sociedad Deportiva Gimnástica Arandina was a Spanish football team based in Aranda de Duero, in the autonomous community of Castile and León. Founded in 1948, it was dissolved in 1987.

History

Club background
Club Deportivo Aranda - (1920–23)
Sociedad Gimnástica Arandina - (1923–25)
Aranda Fútbol Club - (1925–27)
Gimnástica Arandina (I) - (1927–33)
Cultural Arandina - (1932)
Club Deportivo Imperial - (1933)
Gimnástica Arandina - (1948–87)
Arandina Club de Fútbol - (1987–)

Season to season

1 season in Segunda División B
21 seasons in Tercera División

External links
ArefePedia team profile 

Defunct football clubs in Castile and León
Association football clubs established in 1948
Association football clubs disestablished in 1987
1948 establishments in Spain
1987 disestablishments in Spain
Sport in Aranda de Duero